is a Japanese medical equipment manufacturing company. Founded in 1954, the company is headquartered in Osaka and is listed on the Tokyo Stock Exchange and the Osaka Securities Exchange.
As of 2013 the company has 58 subsidiaries in Japan, Asia, North and South America and Europe.

Business units and products
 Medical products
 Renal products
 Injection and infusion products
 Intervention and anesthesiology products
 Cardiopulmonary products
 Diabetic care products
 Pharmaceutical products
 Generic drugs
 Pharmaceutical kit products
 Glass products
 Glass tubes
 Vials, ampoules, syringes, cartridges
 Glass bulbs for vacuum flasks
 Vial, syringe, ampoule manufacturing machines

References

External links
 
 Official website 

Medical device manufacturers
Medical technology companies of Japan
Manufacturing companies based in Osaka
Companies listed on the Tokyo Stock Exchange
Companies listed on the Osaka Exchange
Health care companies established in 1954
Japanese companies established in 1954
Japanese brands
Manufacturing companies established in 1954